Tyler Matthew Young (born December 17, 1990) is an American actor, known for his role as Philip Shea in the USA Network drama limited series Eyewitness. He portrayed Connor Bell in the horror film Polaroid (2019).

Early life
Young was born in Chicago, Illinois, and raised in the suburb of Kildeer. He was educated at Stevenson High School in Lincolnshire, Illinois, and graduated from DePaul University with a degree in advertising and public relations. Young studied acting at The Theatre School at DePaul and improvisational theatre at The Second City. He is of Jewish descent.

Career
In 2016, Young was cast in a leading role in USA Network's drama limited series Eyewitness. He portrayed Philip Shea, a gay teenager in the foster care of a small town sheriff (Julianne Nicholson), who witnesses a triple murder. Young has also starred in the Dimension Films horror film Polaroid (2019) as Connor Bell, opposite Kathryn Prescott and Madelaine Petsch.

He has appeared in guest roles on episodes of NBC's Chicago Fire and Fox's Empire, as well the show Code Black and the mini-series When We Rise.

Filmography

Film

Television

References

External links
 

1990 births
21st-century American male actors
American male film actors
American male television actors
Living people
Male actors from Chicago